Zahrakar-e Nesardeleh (also Romanized as Zahrākār-e Nesārdeleh and Zahrā Kār-e Nesādeleh) is a village in Shurab Rural District, Veysian District, Dowreh County, Lorestan Province, Iran. At the 2006 census, its population was 76, in 15 families.

References 

Towns and villages in Dowreh County